Évelyne Lever (known simply in English as Evelyne Lever) is a contemporary French historian and writer. She was married to a French historian, Maurice Lever, who is the author of Sade.

Lever was previously a research engineer at CNRS, and then began to focus more on 18th-century history. In particular, she focuses on certain people, including Louis XVI, Marie Antoinette and Madame de Pompadour.

Marie Antoinette: The Last Queen of France was her first book to be published in the United States. It is less extensive than Lever's French version (Marie-Antoinette : la dernière reine), and was written specifically for an American audience. The book was originally planned to be the basis of Sofia Coppola's 2006 film Marie Antoinette, before her final decision of using Antonia Fraser's Marie Antoinette: The Journey instead.

She continues to write on and about 18th-century history.

Publications  
 French
 1792, les procès de Louis XVI et de Marie-Antoinette, Complexe
 Louis XVIII, Fayard, 1988
 Louis XVI, Fayard, 1991
 Mémoires du baron de Breteuil, édition critique, Paris, François Bourin, 1992
 Marie-Antoinette : La dernière reine, collection « Découvertes Gallimard » (nº 402). Paris: Éditions Gallimard, 2000
 Madame de Pompadour: A Life, (with) Catherine Temerson, trad. by Catherine Temerson, St. Martin's Press, 2003
 L'Affaire du Collier, Fayard, 2004
 Les dernières noces de la monarchie. Louis XVI et Marie-Antoinette, Fayard, 2005
 Lettres intimes (1778–1782) : Que je suis heureuse d'être ta femme, (written by) Marquis de Bombelles and Marquise de Bombelles, prefaced by Évelyne Lever, Tallandier, 2005
 C'était Marie-Antoinette, Fayard, 2006
 Marie-Antoinette, correspondance (1770–1793), edition established and presented by Évelyne Lever
 Marie-Antoinette : Journal d'une reine, Tallandier, coll. "Texto", 2008
 Le Chevalier d’Eon : " Une vie sans queue ni tête " , with Maurice Lever, Fayard, 2009

 English
 Marie Antoinette: The Last Queen of France, New York: Farrar Straus Giroux, 2000

References 

Historians of France
French non-fiction writers
Year of birth missing (living people)
Living people